ORP Kujawiak was a British Type II  destroyer escort, originally ordered as HMS Oakley.

Kujawiak was built by Vickers-Armstrongs at the company's High Walker yard on the River Tyne. Her keel was laid down on 22 November 1939 and she was launched on 30 October 1940 as HMS Oakley but on completion in June 1941 she was renamed and commissioned into the Polish Navy.

Kujawiak was sunk on 16 June 1942 after running into a German MT 14 minefield near Malta while participating in Operation Harpoon. 13 Polish sailors died and 20 were wounded.

Design
The ship was ordered under the 1939 War Emergency Programme as HMS Oakley on 4 September 1939 from Vickers-Armstrongs High Walker Yard on the Tyne who laid her down on 22 November 1939 with the yard number of J4145. Her engines were to be constructed by Parsons. On her completion on 17 June 1941 she was commissioned as ORP Kujawiak.

War service

1941
On 18 June Kujawiak came under attack by German aircraft whilst on passage from Tyne to Scapa Flow to work-up for operational service with ships of Home Fleet. Fire from the aircraft hit the 4-inch ready-use ammunition which exploded causing one fatal casualty. After completing her work-up on 25 July she joined the 15th Destroyer Flotilla based at Plymouth for local convoy escort and patrol duties.

Later that year on 23 October Kujawiak deployed with fellow Polish destroyer  for escort of inward Convoy SL89 during final stage of passage in Irish Sea from Freetown into Liverpool. On 22 December she sailed from Scapa Flow as part of Force J to carry out landings on the Lofoten Islands as part of Operation Claymore. Two days later on 27 December the destroyer sustained slight damage from a near miss during air attacks.

1942
In early June 1942 Kujawiak was nominated for loan service with the Home Fleet as part of the escort for the planned relief convoy to Malta (Operation Harpoon). On 6 June she joined military Convoy WS19S in the Northwest Approaches as part of Ocean Escort for passage to Gibraltar. She joined Force X at Gibraltar on 12 June whose task was to escort the Harpoon convoy through the Sicilian Narrows to Malta. On 14 June the convoy came under heavy and sustained air attacks during which the cruiser  was damaged. The following day the air attacks continued and Kujawiak was in action with Italian warships attempting to intercept and attack the convoy.

Near midnight on 16 June, while entering Grand Harbor, Malta Kujawiak sustained major structural damage forward after detonating a mine while going to the aid of  after she had struck a mine. Kujawiak sank before a successful tow could be achieved.

Discovery of wreck

On 22 September 2014 a Polish expedition discovered the location of the wreck of Kujawiak. Further dives were made in 2015 and 2017 with the latter recovering the ship's bell which has been passed to the Maritime Museum of Malta for conservation and display. The Maltese government has declared the wreck site a war grave and prohibited unauthorised diving

References

 

Hunt-class destroyers of the Royal Navy
1940 ships
World War II destroyers of the United Kingdom
Hunt-class destroyers of the Polish Navy
World War II destroyers of Poland
World War II shipwrecks in the Mediterranean Sea
Maritime incidents in June 1942
Ships sunk by mines
Shipwrecks of Malta
Ships built on the River Tyne
Ships built by Vickers Armstrong